Trevor Kennedy  (born Trevor John Kennedy; born in Perth, Western Australia, on 24 June 1942; died November 2021) was an Australian businessman and company director. He served on the board of directors of many Australian companies, including Consolidated Press Holdings and Qantas. He was a journalist and right-hand man of Kerry Packer and a former business associate of Malcolm Turnbull, former leader of the Australian Parliamentary Liberal Party and the 29th Prime Minister of Australia.

Education 

Kennedy was educated at Aquinas College in Perth.

Business career 

Kennedy was founding editor of The National Times newspaper (1972–73). In 1997 he was appointed Chairman of AWA Ltd. He served as editor in chief of Australian Consolidated Press Holdings Ltd. (1981–86) and then as managing director of Consolidated Press Holdings (1986–91).

He was a member of the Australian Federal Government's Remuneration Tribunal (1995-2000).
 
During his career he also served as chairman of Oil Search Limited, Commsoft Group Limited, and Cypress Lakes Group Limited, and as a director of both public and private companies, including Qantas Superannuation Limited, Downer EDI Limited, FTR Holdings Limited, and RG Capital Radio Limited.

In 1983 Kennedy was appointed to be a Member in the Ordinary Division of the Order of Australia (AM).

Later events 

In 2003 Kennedy resigned from his position as director of seven public companies (including Qantas).

In 2005 the stockbroker Rene Rivkin told Swiss investigators that he, Kennedy and the politician Graham Richardson were secret owners of a $27 million stake in the Offset Alpine Printing company.

Kennedy died in November 2021.

Further reading
 Neil Chenoweth, Packer's Lunch: A Rollicking Tale Of Swiss Bank Accounts And Money-Making Adventurers In The Roaring '90s (Allen & Unwin, 2006).
 Trevor Kennedy, Top Guns: Seventeen World Leaders in Politics, Media and Business Tell How They Made It to the Top - and Stayed There. South Melbourne, Sun, 1988.

References

1942 births
2021 deaths
Australian businesspeople
People educated at Aquinas College, Perth
Australian journalists
Members of the Order of Australia